Kissed by Winter is a Norwegian film that first premiered February 11, 2005 starring Norwegian actor Kristoffer Joner and Swedish actress Annika Hallin. 

Vinterkyss is similar to the Danish film Brødre in that it paints a very real picture of what can happen to family members in the event of an unexpected death. The movie is about the pain and sorrow that occurs after a loved one's death, as well as how love can appear in the most unexpected of places, even if it is not wanted. The film shows, in an authentic and convincing way, the daily lives of the characters, as well as what it is like to live in a very small community in a very large world.

Victoria (Annika Hallin) starts a new life as a doctor in small, snowy Norwegian town. The film is a story of Victoria's struggle to deal with the deaths of two people: one who was very close to her (her son) and the other very distant (a stranger).

Early one winter morning, a young man is found dead in the snow. Victoria points out that the circumstances surrounding the death are unclear, but the police officer figures that the dead teenager must have been hit by the snow plow and then buried under the snow. The stories of the two deaths become intertwined as Victoria tries to unravel the mystery of Darjosh, the young man found dead in the snow.

Although Darjosh's parents are very reluctant to deal with Victoria, as the movie progresses, they become closer. At the same time she begins a relationship with the town's snow plow driver, Kai.

Awards 
 AFI Fest 2005
 Won, Grand Jury Prize - Sara Johnsen
 Amanda Awards, Norway 2005
 Won, Best Actress (Årets kvinnelige skuespiller) - Annika Hallin
 Won, Best Debut - Sara Johnsen

External links 
 
2005 films
Norwegian thriller drama films
2000s Norwegian-language films
Films directed by Sara Johnsen